was a Japanese science fiction writer and screenwriter.  He was one of the most well known and highly regarded science fiction writers in Japan.

Early life
Born Minoru "Sakyo" Komatsu in Osaka, he was a graduate of Kyoto University where he studied Italian literature. After graduating, he worked at various jobs, including as a magazine reporter and a writer for stand-up comedy acts.

Career
Komatsu's writing career began in the 1960s. Reading Kōbō Abe and Italian classics made Komatsu feel modern literature and science fiction are the same.

In 1961, he submitted for the 1st Scientific-fiction Contest of Hayakawa's SF Magazine: "Peace on Earth" was a short story in which World War II does not end in 1945 and a young man prepares to defend Japan against the Allied invasion. Komatsu received an honourable mention and 5000 yen.

He won the same contest the following year with the story, "Memoirs of an Eccentric Time Traveller". His first novel, The Japanese Apache, was published two years later and sold 50,000 copies.

In the West he is best known for the novels Japan Sinks (1973) and Sayonara Jupiter (1982). Both were adapted to film, Submersion of Japan (1973) and Bye Bye Jupiter (1984). The story "The Savage Mouth" was translated by Judith Merril and has been anthologized.

At the time of publication, his apocalyptic vision of a sunk Japan wiped out by shifts incurred through geographic stress worried a Japan still haunted by the atomic devastation of Hiroshima and Nagasaki. He was inspired to write it thinking of what would happen if the nationalistic Japanese lost their land, and ironically prefigured the 2011 Tōhoku earthquake and tsunami that triggered a nuclear plant disaster decades later on March 11, 2011 – the result of which he was interested in "to see how Japan would evolve" after the catastrophe.

Komatsu was involved in organizing the Japan World Exposition in Osaka Prefecture in 1970. In 1984, Komatsu served as a technical consultant for a live concert in Linz, Austria by Japanese electronic composer Isao Tomita. He won the 1985 Nihon SF Taisho Award. Komatsu was one of two Author Guests of Honor at Nippon 2007, the 65th World Science Fiction Convention in 2007 in Yokohama, Japan. This was the first Worldcon to be held in Asia.

With Shin'ichi Hoshi and Yasutaka Tsutsui, Komatsu was considered one of the masters of Japanese science fiction.

Death
Komatsu died on July 26, 2011 in Osaka from complications with pneumonia at the age of 80. Five days before his death, his quarterly publication, Sakyo Komatsu Magazine, released an issue featuring an article on his thoughts about the 2011 tsunami. In the article, Komatsu expressed hope that his country would evolve after the catastrophe. "I had thought I wouldn't mind dying any day ... but now I'm feeling like living a little bit longer and seeing how Japan will go on hereafter," he wrote.

Works in English translation
Novels
Japan Sinks
Virus: The Day of Resurrection (Viz Media, 2012)

Short stories
"The Savage Mouth"
The Best Japanese Science Fiction Stories, Dembner Books, 1989 / Barricade Books, 1997
Speculative Japan, Kurodahan Press, 2007
"Take Your Choice" (The Best Japanese Science Fiction Stories, Dembner Books, 1989 / Barricade Books, 1997)
"The Kudan's Mother" (Kaiki: Uncanny Tales from Japan, Volume 2: Country Delights, Kurodahan Press, 2010)

Works 
A complete works collection is being published in on-demand-print format by Jōsai Kokusai Daigaku Shuppankai.

Novels
  (1964)
  (1964); English translation: Virus: The Day of Resurrection (2012)
  (1965)
  (1965)
  (1966)
  (1966)
  (1969)
  (1972)
  (1973); English translation (abridged): Japan Sinks (1976)
  (1977)
  (1977)
  (1977)
  (1981)
  (1982)
  (1988)
  (1985)
  (1987, 2000) (unfinished)
  (2006) (co-written with Kōshū Tani)

Short story collections

  (1963)
  (1964)
  (1965)
  (1967)
  (1967)
  (1968)
  (1968)
  (1973)

Manga 
 Maboroshi no Komatsu Sakyō Mori Minoru Manga Zenshū (2002)

Adaptations

Theatrical film
 Tidal Wave (1973), based on Japan Sinks
 ESPY (1974)
 Virus (1980)
 Sayonara Jupiter (1984)
 Tokyo Blackout (1987), based on Shuto shōshitsu
 Sinking of Japan (2006), based on Japan Sinks, remake of Tidal Wave

Television
 Uchūjin Pipi (1965, NHK)
 Kūchūtoshi 008 (1969, NHK) —Science fiction Marionette drama
 Saru no gundan (1974, TBS) —Science fiction Tokusatsu drama
 Nihon Chinbotsu (1974, TBS) —Television version of film
 Komatsu sakyō anime gekijō (Sakyo Komatsu's Animation Theater) (1989)
 Japan Sinks: 2020 — Netflix anime adaptation (2020)

References

External links
Sakyo Komatsu Home Page (In Japanese)
J'Lit | Authors : Sakyo Komatsu | Books from Japan 
List of his translated works
Tribute him by Aritsune Toyoda, translated by Leslie Furlong

1931 births
2011 deaths
Kyoto University alumni
Japanese science fiction writers
Japanese screenwriters
Mystery Writers of Japan Award winners
Writers from Osaka
Deaths from pneumonia in Japan